Deep Horizon is an adventure module for the 3rd edition of the Dungeons & Dragons fantasy role-playing game.

Plot summary
In Deep Horizon, the subterranean humanoid race known as the desmodus are in danger of being eliminated by evil beholders and salamanders.

Publication history
Deep Horizon was published in 2001, and was written by Skip Williams, with cover art by Brom and interior art by David Roach.

Reception

References

Dungeons & Dragons modules
Role-playing game supplements introduced in 2001